Michael Jay Hartman (born February 7, 1967) is an American former professional ice hockey player who played in 397 games in the National Hockey League (NHL) for 13 seasons the Buffalo Sabres, Winnipeg Jets, Tampa Bay Lightning, and New York Rangers. He was drafted in the seventh round, 131st overall, by the Sabres in the 1986 NHL Entry Draft.

Hartman played Canadian junior hockey with the Belleville Bulls and North Bay Centennials of the Ontario Hockey League, where he compiled 102 points and 473 penalty minutes in 138 games.  Hartman represented the United States at the 1987 World Junior Ice Hockey Championships and appeared for the Sabres later that same year, as he amassed six points in 17 National Hockey League (NHL) games.  In 1994, he was originally left off the Stanley Cup along with teammate Ed Olczyk because they did not play the 41 regular season games or 1 game in the finals. Rangers protested saying Hartman and Olczyk had missed time due injuries, and should be on the Stanley Cup. NHL agreed and later added their names.

In 1995 he was inducted into the Michigan Jewish Sports Hall of Fame. On April 29, 2012 Hartman was inducted into the National Jewish Sports Hall of Fame and Museum in a ceremony in Commack, N.Y.

Biography
Hartman was born in Detroit, Michigan, and is Jewish. As a youth, he played in the 1980 Quebec International Pee-Wee Hockey Tournament with a minor ice hockey team from Detroit. He graduated from West Bloomfield High School.

He began his career in 1983–84 playing for the North York Rangers in the OJHL, then in 1984–85 and 1985–86 for the Belleville Bulls in the OHL and also in 1985–86 for the North Bay Centennials of the OHL.

Hartman split the following season between Buffalo and their AHL affiliate, the Rochester Americans, before becoming a full-time NHL'er in 1988–89.  That season, Hartman racked up a career-high 316 penalty minutes and added 8 goals.  The 1989–90 season proved to be Hartman's best statistically, as he scored a career-high 11 goals and 10 assists and led the Sabres in penalty minutes for the second straight year with 211.

At the beginning of the 1991–92 season, after three full seasons with the Sabres, Hartman was part of a five player swap with the Winnipeg Jets.  The Sabres traded Hartman, forward Darrin Shannon and defenceman Dean Kennedy to the Jets in exchange for forward Dave McLlwain, defenceman Gord Donnelly and the Jets' fifth round pick in the 1992 NHL Entry Draft (Yuri Khmylev).  Hartman accounted for eight points and 264 penalty minutes in his only year with the Jets, who left him unprotected in the expansion draft that followed the season.

Hartman was leading the Lightning with 154 penalty minutes.  At the trade deadline that season, Hartman was traded to the New York Rangers for forward Randy Gilhen. He played 3 games at the season of the Rangers.   Injuries would limit the number of games Mike played in the next two season.  He only played 35 games as in 1993-94, and 1 game for Rangers in 1994-95. He scored 1 goal, 1 assist and amassing 80 penalty minutes for the Rangers.  For his NHL career, Hartman scored 43 goals, added 35 assists and had 1388 penalty minutes in 397 regular season contests.

In 1995, Hartman moved to the IHL's Orlando Solar Bears, where he scored 24 points in 77 games.  Hartman played four of his last five professional seasons with the Charlotte Checkers of the ECHL, retiring after the 2003–04 season.  The exception was the 1998–99 season, which he spent with Kölner Haie of Germany's Deutsche Eishockey Liga.  That season, Hartman also played three games for USA Hockey's qualifying squad which won a berth in the World Championships.

He competed on Team USA in hockey at the 1997 Maccabiah Games in Israel, which won a silver medal.

Career statistics

Regular season and playoffs

International

Awards and achievements 
 Stanley Cup Champion 1993-94 New York Rangers

See also
List of select Jewish ice hockey players

References

External links
 

1967 births
American men's ice hockey left wingers
Belleville Bulls players
Buffalo Sabres players
Charlotte Checkers (1993–2010) players
Detroit Vipers players
Hershey Bears players
Ice hockey people from Detroit
Jewish ice hockey players
Maccabiah Games competitors for the United States
Competitors at the 1997 Maccabiah Games
Kölner Haie players
Living people
New York Rangers players
North Bay Centennials players
Orlando Solar Bears (IHL) players
Rochester Americans players
Stanley Cup champions
Tampa Bay Lightning players
Winnipeg Jets (1979–1996) players